Bonferey is the first private television channel in Niger, founded on 8 February 2008. The channel shows news and politics of the world.

Programs
 Le Journale
 TV Bonferey Edition Speciale
 Presse +
 Gasar du Tamako
 5 Dernieres Minutes
 Debat Gaskya

References 

Television stations in Niger
Mass media in Niamey
Television channels and stations established in 2008
2008 establishments in Niger